John Robert Brown (December 10, 1909 – January 23, 1993) was a United States circuit judge of the United States Court of Appeals for the Fifth Circuit in 1950s and 1960s, one of the "Fifth Circuit Four" pivotal in the civil rights movement.

Education and career

Born on December 10, 1909, in Funk, Nebraska, Brown received an Artium Baccalaureus degree in 1930 from the University of Nebraska–Lincoln and a Juris Doctor in 1932 from the University of Michigan Law School. Brown entered private practice in Houston and Galveston, Texas from 1932 to 1955, except for 1942 to 1946, when he served as a Major in the United States Army during World War II. He was employed at the law firm of Royston Rayzor and specialized in admiralty law.

Federal judicial service
Brown was nominated by President Dwight D. Eisenhower on April 25, 1955, to a seat on the United States Court of Appeals for the Fifth Circuit vacated by Judge Robert Lee Russell. He was confirmed by the United States Senate on July 22, 1955, and received his commission on July 27, 1955. He served as Chief Judge and as a member of the Judicial Conference of the United States from 1967 to 1979. He assumed senior status on July 20, 1984.  He was the last federal appeals court judge in active service to have been appointed to his position by President Eisenhower. His service terminated on January 23, 1993, due to his death in Houston.

Fifth Circuit Four
Brown became known as one of the "Fifth Circuit Four"—Brown, Elbert Tuttle, Richard Rives, and John Minor Wisdom—so called because of a series of decisions crucial in advancing the civil rights of African-Americans. At that time, the Fifth Circuit included not only Louisiana, Mississippi, and Texas (its jurisdiction ), but also Alabama, Georgia, Florida, and the Panama Canal Zone.

Role in split of the old Fifth Circuit
During his service as Chief Judge, Brown was crucial to the administrative actions splitting the new Eleventh Circuit (Alabama, Georgia and Florida) from the Old Fifth Circuit which included those states up to September 1981, leaving the current Fifth Circuit with Texas, Louisiana and Mississippi.

Honors
The Judge John R. Brown Admiralty Moot Court Competition was established shortly before Brown's death and is now held annually, sponsored by the University of Texas School of Law. The Judge Brown Admiralty Collection at the O'Quinn Law Library at the University of Houston Law Center is named in Brown's honor.

Notes

References

External links
 
 John R. Brown (1910–1993): The Judge Who Charted the Course
 Judge John R. Brown Admiralty Moot Court Competition
 History of the Court of Appeals, on the 11th Circuit Court website

1909 births
1993 deaths
University of Nebraska–Lincoln alumni
University of Michigan Law School alumni
Judges of the United States Court of Appeals for the Fifth Circuit
United States court of appeals judges appointed by Dwight D. Eisenhower
20th-century American judges